The Coop Creek Bridge is a historic bridge in Sebastian County, Arkansas, just outside the city of Mansfield. It carries Broadway, designated County Route 62, across Coop Creek just north of Mansfield Lake. The bridge is set on masonry abutments and piers, with a reinforced concrete deck that is lined by simple concrete railings. It is a well-preserved example of a masonry bridge built in 1940.

The bridge was listed on the National Register of Historic Places in 1995.

See also
National Register of Historic Places listings in Sebastian County, Arkansas
List of bridges on the National Register of Historic Places in Arkansas

References

Road bridges on the National Register of Historic Places in Arkansas
Bridges completed in 1940
Transportation in Sebastian County, Arkansas
National Register of Historic Places in Sebastian County, Arkansas
Brick bridges in the United States
1940 establishments in Arkansas
Works Progress Administration in Arkansas